DNP may refer to:

Science and technology
 2,4-Dinitrophenol, a small organic molecule formerly marketed as a pharmaceutical "diet aid"
 Deoxyribonucleoprotein, a complex of DNA and protein
 Distance to neutral point, a quantity which is important when considering thermal expansion mismatch
 Distributed Network Protocol (DNP3), a protocol used in SCADA systems for communication with remote terminal units and intelligent electronic devices
 "Do not populate" or "do not place", a term used in printed circuit board design to denote the omitting of a component
 Dynamic nuclear polarization, a technique used in NMR spectroscopy

Government and politics
 German National Party (German: Deutsche Nationalpartei), a former German political party in Czechoslovakia
 "Duty Not Paid", in the context of cigarette smuggling

Other uses
 Dai Nippon Printing, the world's largest printing company, based in Japan
 Defects notification period (applicable to a construction contract), an additional period of time following completion during which the duty to perform the contract continues to exist
 Deosai National Park, Pakistan
 Der Neue Pauly, a more compact edition of Realencyclopädie der classischen Altertumswissenschaft (Pauly-Wissowa)
 Doctor of Nursing Practice, a professional doctorate in nursing
 Did not play, see Glossary of basketball terms